The South Coast Derby is a term used to describe football matches played between Portsmouth Football Club and Southampton Football Club. The term is popular in broadcast media and newspapers.

Portsmouth play their home games at Fratton Park, while Southampton currently play theirs at St. Mary's Stadium. Portsmouth and Southampton are the most successful clubs on the southern coast of England, and lie only 19 miles (31 km) apart in Hampshire. However, because the two clubs have often been in different divisions, the derby game has only been played 71 times in "First Class" competition since the first one in 1899.

Portsmouth have won the most titles of the pair, being champions of England twice (1948–49 and 1949–50) and twice FA Cup winners (1939 and 2008), whilst Southampton have won a single FA Cup (1976). In "first class" matches between the two teams, Southampton have the most wins, and have been more regularly in a higher league than Portsmouth, including their 27 consecutive years in the top flight of English football. However, Portsmouth were southern England's first club (outside of London) to reach the top division in 1927 and stayed for 34 consecutive years until relegated in 1961, five years before Southampton finally reached Division One.

In the 2022–23 season, Southampton play in the first tier Premier League and Portsmouth are in the third tier EFL League One.

Changing fortunes 

Southampton were originally formed in 1885 as St. Mary's Young Men's Association F.C., before adopting the name Southampton St. Mary's when the club joined the Southern League in 1894. After they won the Southern League title in 1896–97, the club became a limited company and changed their name to Southampton F.C. 
Portsmouth was founded in April 1898 and joined the Southern League in 1899.

The first match between the two clubs came in a friendly at Portsmouth's Fratton Park ground on 6 September 1899. The match was won "on their merits" 2–0 by Portsmouth, with goals from Dan Cunliffe (formerly with Liverpool) and Harold Clarke (formerly with Everton).

Southampton and Portsmouth first played each other in the Southern League in April 1900, with Portsmouth winning 2–0 twice in three days. The teams met regularly in the Southern League, and in the early years of the 20th century were rivals for the league title, with Southampton taking the title in 1901, 1903 and 1904 (having also been champions in three consecutive seasons from 1896–97 to 1898–99, before Portsmouth were formed) and Portsmouth taking the title in 1902 (and again in 1920).

The first of  four South Coast derbies in the FA Cup took place on 13 January 1906. Because of the large crowd expected for the first FA Cup meeting between the two rivals, the local registrars in both towns postponed voting in the 1906 general election until the following week. The match at The Dell was attended by a capacity crowd of 14,000 and the Portsmouth fans, together with their players, did their best to unsettle the inexperienced 'keeper, Bill Stead, who was making only his second first team appearance. Stead, however, showed few signs of nerves and produced a "phlegmatic performance", restricting Portsmouth to a single goal from Dan Cunliffe, while the Saints scored five and eventually progressed to the last eight, where they lost 3–0 at Liverpool.

For the 1920–21 season, both teams were admitted to the Football League (together with the majority of the Southern League First Division sides). The first Football League game between the two clubs was on 11 September 1920, with Southampton winning 2–0. After two seasons in the Third Division, Saints were promoted as champions in 1922. Pompey joined them in the Second Division in 1924 and were promoted to the First Division in 1927, becoming the first southern club outside of London to reach the top tier of English football. Up to this time the teams had met ten times in the Football League, with Saints winning four, Pompey three and three draws.

From 1927 until 1960 Portsmouth enjoyed a much-superior league position to their neighbours, winning the FA Cup in 1939 and back-to-back League Titles in 1948–49 and 1949–50, until 1960, when Southampton gained promotion back to the Second Division, Portsmouth having been relegated from the First Division the previous season. From the 1960s onwards, Southampton found themselves in the ascendancy, being in a superior division nearly every season while defeating their rivals whenever the two sides met in cup clashes.

With Southampton being in a higher division for most of the period from the 1960s through to the early 2000s, the two clubs rarely met. Events such as the death of Portsmouth goalkeeper Aaron Flahavan, a Southampton-born footballer whose brother Darryl had played for Southampton, occasionally brought the fans together. However, events of recent years have altered this markedly.

Southampton dominated the South Coast derby games in the post-war era, with 14 wins against Portsmouth's 6. Portsmouth's promotion to the Premiership in 2003 evened matters and reignited the clubs' rivalry – the first time the two teams had met in regular league competition since the 1987–88 First Division season. Southampton held the upper-hand, winning two of the three matches played between the two sides in the 2003–04 season to Portsmouth's one.

The rivalry was galvanised with the appointment of Harry Redknapp as Southampton manager in December 2004, just days after he had resigned as manager of Portsmouth, and less than a month after the Saints had beaten Portsmouth at St Mary's Stadium. The following month, the Saints were drawn against and defeated their rivals in a fiery FA Cup match, with former Portsmouth striker Peter Crouch (who would go on to rejoin Portsmouth in 2008) scoring the decisive penalty in the last minute of the match.

However, Portsmouth struck back in the next league encounter between the rivals, with Southampton beaten 4–1 at Fratton Park by their relegation rivals in Redknapp's only return to the ground with the club. Southampton were subsequently relegated from the Premiership a few games later on the final day of the 2004–05 season, ending their 27-year run in the top flight of English Football. Harry Redknapp caused more controversy when he left Southampton and returned to Portsmouth and enjoyed success.

Portsmouth won the FA Cup again in 2008 under Redknapp whilst, in 2009, Southampton were again relegated, this time to League One. The two sides met in a fierce FA Cup match at St Mary's in 2010 which Portsmouth came out 4–1 victors again and went on to reach the FA Cup final that season but did not perform too well in the league. Portsmouth were in turn relegated to the Championship for the 2010–11 season after having been deducted nine points as a penalty for entering administration.

The matches played during the 2011–12 season both ended as draws, but the club's fortunes differed considerably with Southampton gaining promotion to the Premier League and Portsmouth once again going into administration and being relegated to League One.

 Harry Redknapp 
The acrimonious departure of Harry Redknapp from Portsmouth to Southampton brought the bitter rivalry between the two clubs to a new level. When Redknapp returned to Portsmouth in November 2005 following Southampton's relegation, it only served to further sour relations between the two clubs, which arguably remain at an all-time low. The two clubs' chairmen at the time, Rupert Lowe (Southampton) and Milan Mandarić (Portsmouth), publicly criticised one another on a number of occasions, with Lowe calling for an inquest into irregular betting patterns in the run-up to Redknapp's re-appointment. Mandarić had even sent a boxed duck as a Christmas "gift" to Lowe (as Lowe had been on a hunting trip when the "ordeal" began), but the gesture only furthered the animosity between the two.

Inter-fan rivalry
Exactly when the fierce rivalry between the supporters of the two clubs began is not entirely clear. Until as recently as the early 1970s, many fans would go and watch the other team when their side was playing away, indicating anything but hatred. Some ascribe the growing rivalry since then to the cities' diverging economic fortunes.

In 1976, there were changes in fortune for both cities and their football clubs. Portsmouth International Port was built next to the new M275 motorway spur, both opening in 1976. This was seen as a threat to the Port of Southampton by its dockers. Portsmouth FC, on a decline, lost a fifth consecutive derby match against Southampton in a period from 1966 to 1976. Southampton FC, then in Division Two, were on the rise and won a shock victory in the 1976 FA Cup Final against Division One team Manchester United 1-0 at Wembley Stadium. The goal was scored by Portsmouth-born Bobby Stokes.

Southampton were promoted to Division One in 1978. Meanwhile, Portsmouth plummeted to Division Four in the same period. Jealously, bragging, changing fortunes between the opposing fans, and the rise of football hooliganism in 1970s England are most likely the cause of the bitter rivalry that now exists between both sets of supporters.

In the early 1980s, cross-channel ferry services then moved from Southampton to Portsmouth International Port. Portsmouth's closer proximity to the European continent saved fuel, journey time and made more economic sense to ferry operators. Portsmouth's closer distance to London by road and rail was also seen as a positive by European visitors.

In the 1987-88 Division One season, Portsmouth and Southampton both met in the top division of English football for the first time in their shared histories. This was the first season that Southampton fans began using the derogatory Skate nickname for Portsmouth's supporters, which had been chosen from a fanzine poll. Despite a 2-2 home draw at Fratton Park, and a 0-2 away win at The Dell, Southampton, Portsmouth were eventually relegated back to Division Two after only one season.

In the early 2000s, Southampton based ship builder Vosper Thornycroft moved from its Woolston yard to new facilities at Portchester (near Portsmouth), and also into a newly built ship hall within HMNB Portsmouth. West Quay shopping mall in Southampton city centre was also opened, which attracted many Portsmouth residents away from Portsmouth's traditional shopping areas, favouring the new West Quay mall which offered more variety than Portsmouth's declining Commercial Road and Palmerston Road shopping areas.

On 15 May 2005, Portsmouth - now in the Premier League - lost 2-0 away to relegation threatened West Bromwich Albion. Portsmouth's loss earned West Bromwich Albion three points and survival to end one place above the relegation zone. However, this result also affected and confirmed bottom-placed Southampton's relegation to the second tier of English football for the first time since 1978. Portsmouth supporters ironically celebrated their 2-0 loss to West Bromwich Albion as a victory, which had relegated Southampton to a division lower than that of Portsmouth. The last occasion this had happened was in the 1960-61 season, where Portsmouth had been in Division Two and Southampton were in Division Three.

In 2015, 10,000 Portsmouth people signed a petition against Portsmouth City Council's decision to allow airline Emirates to use its red and white livery (Southampton colours) for its sponsorship of the Spinnaker Tower in Portsmouth. The city council subsequently came to an agreement with sponsors Emirates to use blue and gold (Portsmouth colours) instead.

 Nicknames 
Portsmouth supporters refer to Southampton supporters as "Scum" or "Scummers". According to some Portsmouth fans, the term "scum" developed out of an fictitious acronym standing for Southampton City (or Corporation) Union Men, with the term allegedly originating from when Southampton dockyard workers supposedly crossed the picket lines in the 1930s when Portsmouth dockyard workers were on strike. However this story is unlikely, as the two cities rely on entirely different types of ports — Southampton being a merchant port and Portsmouth a naval one. There is also no known record of any strike occurring during the mentioned time period. Rather, this seems to be a modern attempt to incorrectly describe the origins of the rivalry.

Southampton supporters have taken to referring to their local rivals as "Skates", after a Southampton fanzine, The Ugly Inside asked its readers in 1988 to suggest an abusive term most likely to cause offence to Portsmouth supporters. This date coincides with Portsmouth's return to the Football League Division One in its 1987–88 season, when both clubs occupied the same division for the first time since 1976. Skates'' was chosen as the derisive alternative to "matelot" to describe naval sailors, Portsmouth being the home of the Royal Navy.

Derby results in summary 
"First class" competitions only

All-time results

League

Cup tournaments

Players who have played for both clubs
Updated to 6 August 2022

Managed both clubs

 Alan Ball
 Harry Redknapp

Played for one, managed/coached the other

 Alan Ball
 Kevin Bond
 Arthur Chadwick
 Jimmy Easson
 Stuart Gray
 Joe Jordan
 Steve Wigley
 Harry Wood

Women's football

Both Portsmouth and Southampton have had women's counterparts in the past. Southampton Saints L.F.C. had the better history, affiliating to Southampton F.C. and taking on the club name in 1995, maintaining membership of the FA Women's Premier League National Division from 1998 to 2003 and finishing runners-up in the Women's FA Cup in 1998-99. Portsmouth F.C. Women, formed in 1987, has never climbed higher than the second tier.

Both teams played in the Southern Championship in the 2006–07 season. Portsmouth was a strong contender for promotion (they finished 3rd), while Southampton was relegated to the Regional Combinations. The former Portsmouth manager, Vanessa Raynbird, also played in and later managed Southampton as well.

Southampton F.C. had ended its links with Southampton Saints L.F.C. in 2005. In 2017, Southampton F.C. formed a women's section, Southampton F.C. Women. In summer 2021 Southampton F.C. Women were awarded upward club movement to the third-tier FA Women's National League Southern Premier Division, of which Portsmouth F.C. Women are long-serving members, meaning the 2021-22 season saw the resumption of the South Coast Women's Derby.

Major honours won by the clubs

References

Bibliography

External links
Saints vs. Pompey: A recent history
"Chimes could be a-changing", BBC Sport article on the rivalry between Southampton and Portsmouth
Scummers v Skates (Article in Guardian newspaper 23 January 2005)
(Which two rivals have the world’s closest derby record? Article in Guardian newspaper 24 Sept 2014)

England football derbies
Portsmouth F.C.
Southampton F.C.